Jamalganj railway station is a railway station in Joypurhat, Rajshahi Division, Bangladesh.it's millage in 358/8

See also
 Joypurhat railway station
 Santahar railway station

References

Railway stations in Joypurhat District